Tomás Sánchez de la Barrera (June 4, 1709 - January 21, 1796) was a veteran Spanish captain who founded Laredo, Texas, United States, and Nuevo Laredo, Tamaulipas, Mexico, the only town in the Nuevo Santander province.

Origins
Captain Tomas Sanchez de la Barrera y de la Garza was born into northern Mexico's oligarchic families. His father's family roots can be traced to the old hidalgo families of Andalucia, Spain. His mother is descended from the noble Oñate-Zaldivar family, conquistadors of New Mexico; and the politically entrenched De La Garza family, conquerors of Nuevo León, Mexico, who controlled extensive lands from Saltillo to the Rio Grande.

Founding of Laredo
He first arrived in Texas in 1749 to a place he named "El Paso de Jacinto", later called "Indian Ford", which is now west of Downtown Laredo. He then petitioned Colonel José de Escandón, 1st Count of Sierra Gorda for permission to found a town at this location. His petition was granted on May 15, 1755. He named the new townsite, Villa de San Agustin de Laredo, in honor of Saint Augustine and Colonel Escandon's hometown Laredo, Cantabria, Spain. Don Tomás Sánchez first established three families in the new villa. The site selected is located in the San Agustine Historical District in Downtown Laredo near the San Agustine Cathedral.

Gallery of Old Laredo

References

External links
Tomás Sánchez de la Barrera y Garza

1709 births
1796 deaths
History of Laredo, Texas
History of Nuevo Laredo
People from Laredo, Texas
People from Nuevo Laredo
People of Spanish Texas
Tejano people